"Sho Nuff" is the lead single released from Tela's  debut album, Piece of Mind. The song featured Tela's labelmates 8Ball & MJG, as well as Jazze Pha, who both performed the song's hook and produced the song.

"Sho Nuff" became a moderate hit, peaking at number 58 on the Billboard Hot 100 and becoming a top-10 hit on the Billboard Hot Rap Singles. It was the only single of Tela's to reach the Billboard charts.

Single track listing

A-Side
"Sho Nuff" (Clean Version) - 5:07
"Sho Nuff" (Street Version) - 5:07
"Sho Nuff" (Instrumental Version) - 5:07

B-Side
"Suave House" (Clean Version) - 4:56
"Suave House" (Instrumental Version) - 4:56

Charts

Peak positions

Year-End charts

References

1997 singles